Iota Andromedae is a single star in the northern constellation of Andromeda. It has the Flamsteed designation 17 Andromedae, while Iota Andromedae is the Bayer designation as Latinized from ι Andromedae. This object is visible to the naked eye at night as a faint, blue-white hued star with an apparent visual magnitude of +4.29. Based upon parallax measurements, it is located approximately 500 light years distant from the Sun.

This object is a B-type main-sequence star with a stellar classification of B8 V. It is among the least variable stars observed during the Hipparcos mission. The star is 116 million years old with 3.1 times the mass of the Sun and is spinning with a projected rotational velocity of 70 km/s. It is radiating 638 times the luminosity of the Sun from its photosphere at an effective temperature of 12,620 K. The star is somewhat metal-poor, although the abundance of helium is close to solar. The latter excludes it from membership among the class of peculiar stars. Iota Andromedae is a debris disk candidate, showing an infrared excess at a wavelength of 18 μm.

Name
In the catalogue of stars in the Calendarium of Al Achsasi Al Mouakket, this star was designated Keff al-Salsalat (كف المسلسلة - kaf al-musalsala), which was translated into Latin as Manus Catenata, meaning palm of chained woman.

References

B-type main-sequence stars

Andromeda (constellation)
Andromedae, Iota
Andromedae, 17
BD+42 4720
116631
222173
8965